Telephone numbers in the United Kingdom are administered by the Office of Communications (Ofcom). For this purpose, Ofcom established a telephone numbering plan, known as the National Telephone Numbering Plan, which is the system for assigning telephone numbers to subscriber stations.

The numbers are of variable length. Local numbers are supported from land-lines or numbers can be dialled with a '0'-lead prefix that denotes either a geographical region or another service. Mobile phone numbers have their own prefixes which are not geographical and are completely portable between providers.

Structure
All mobile numbers, nearly all geographic numbers and nearly all non-geographic numbers have 10 national (significant) numbers after the "0" trunk code. The overall structure of the UK's National Numbering Plan is:

A short sample of geographic numbers, set out in the officially approved (Ofcom) number groups:

In the United Kingdom, area codes are two, three, four or, exceptionally, five digits long (after the initial zero). Regions with shorter area codes, typically large cities, permit the allocation of more telephone numbers as the local number portion has more digits. Local customer numbers are four to eight digits long. The total number of digits is ten or, very rarely, nine (not including the initial zero). The "area code" is also referred to as an "STD (code)" or a "dialling code" in the UK.

The code allocated to the largest population is (020) for London. The code allocated to the largest area is (028) for all of Northern Ireland. The UK Numbering Plan also applies to three British Crown dependencies – Guernsey, Jersey, and the Isle of Man – even though they are not part of the UK.

Format

Possible number formats for UK telephone numbers are:

Number ranges starting 01 can have National Significant Number (NSN) length of 10 or (very rarely) 9 digits. NSN is the number of digits after the leading 0 trunk code or +44 international prefix. The 0800 range can have NSN length as 10, 9 or 7 digits. The 0845 range can have NSN length as 10 or 7 digits. The 0500 range had NSN length as 9 digits only, and was withdrawn from use on 3 June 2017. All other UK numbers have NSN length of 10 digits. There are no telephone numbers in the UK with an NSN length of 8 digits.

Geographic numbers

Standard geographic numbers
Geographic telephone numbers in the UK always have nine or ten digits after the 0 trunk code or +44 international dialling prefix.

Four-digit area codes
Four-digit area codes have either six-digit subscriber numbers or a mix of five- and six-digit subscriber numbers.
 (01xxx) xxx xxx

This is the format used by most areas. It has a four-digit area code (after the initial zero) and a six digit subscriber number, and is known as 4+6 format. These area codes were changed by adding a "1" directly after the initial zero as a part of PhONEday in 1995. Just short of 581 areas use this format, and the area codes range from 01200 to 01998. Almost all (01xxx) area codes now have only six digit subscriber numbers, but a small number of these areas also have some subscriber numbers only five digits in length (see next section).

Six of the four-digit area codes are known as "mixed" areas as they share those four digits with the twelve five-digit area codes. This leads to a restriction as to which initial digits can be used for subscriber numbers within those four-digit area codes, e.g. in the 01387 four-digit area code, subscriber numbers cannot begin with a 3 because 013873 is a separate five-digit area code; likewise in the 01946 four-digit area code, subscriber numbers cannot begin with a 7 because 019467 is a separate five-digit area code.
 (01xxx) xx xxx

This is used for forty smaller towns which have a mixture of six and five digit local numbers, each type allocated in specific DE blocks*; e.g. in the 01647 area code numbers beginning 24 and 61 have five digits (24xxx and 61xxx; known as 4+5 format) whereas all other DE blocks* within that area code have six digit numbers. The number of places with five digit subscriber numbers and an 01xxx area code has declined rapidly in recent decades. There were 511 ranges allocated across 56 different area codes in January 1998. The Big Number Change removed many, especially in Northern Ireland, and by July 2005 there were only 329 ranges in 42 codes. By April 2010 this had reduced to 324 ranges in 40 codes, with still the same number in November 2012. The 40 area codes are listed in the table below.

*A DE block is a block of numbers where (taking the area code and the subscriber number together) the initial 0 and the next six digits after it are the same for all the subscriber numbers in the block.

(These area codes, like many others, were changed by adding a "1" directly after the initial zero as a part of PhONEday in 1995.)

Three-digit area codes
Three-digit area codes always have seven-digit subscriber numbers and always begin 011x or 01x1.
 (01x1) xxx xxxx

This is the geographic number format for the first round of five large cities moved to all figure dialling in the 1960s, and subsequently also used in the metropolitan county of Tyne and Wear, eastern County Durham and south-eastern Northumberland from the 1980s onwards. These six areas have a three-digit area code matching the pattern 1x1 (after the initial zero) and a seven digit subscriber number, and this is known as 3+7 format. These area codes were changed by adding a "1" directly after the initial zero as a part of PhONEday in 1995.

 (011x) xxx xxxx

This is the geographic number format for the second round of large cities and towns moved to brand-new three-digit area codes. Five of these were moved in 1995 as a part of PhONEday, with Reading then following a year later. At the time of the change, an extra digit was added to the subscriber number. These six areas have a three-digit area code matching the pattern 11x, with a seven-digit subscriber number, and this is known as 3+7 format. The first three digits of the local number identifies a small area within the town or city. The former Reading area code had already been changed once, by adding a "1" directly after the initial zero as a part of PhONEday in 1995.

Two-digit area codes
Two-digit area codes always have eight-digit subscriber numbers and always begin 02.
 (02x) xxxx xxxx

This is the newest geographic number format. It is used for the third tier of large cities and for Northern Ireland, and was formed as a part of the Big Number Change in 2000. The new area code is much shorter than the old one, and begins 02 unlike the previous 01 area codes. Numbers in these five areas are commonly misquoted, e.g. London as 0207 or Cardiff as 02920. The numbers consist of a two-digit area code matching the pattern 02x, and an eight-digit subscriber number, and this is known as 2+8 format.

The first four digits of the local number identifies a small area within the town or city. At the time of the change, the subscriber part of the number gained an extra digit in London, those in Northern Ireland gained two or three digits, and the subscriber part of the number in the other areas gained two digits. All of these areas were also subject to a previous code change, one that added a "1" directly after the initial zero as a part of PhONEday in 1995.

Five-digit area codes
Five-digit area codes have either five-digit subscriber numbers or a mix of four- and five-digit subscriber numbers.
Five-digit area codes always share their first four digits with four-digit area codes.
 (01xx xx) xx xxx and (01xx xx) xxxx

This is the oldest geographic number format and is used for twelve smaller towns and villages where the subscriber number is either five or (in one area code) four digits long. These are known as 5+5 and 5+4 format. Therefore, the STD code and the subscriber number does not always total ten digits after the initial zero trunk code. These area codes were changed by adding a "1" directly after the initial zero as a part of PhONEday in 1995. The number of places using these two formats has declined rapidly in recent decades and Brampton is the last place in the UK with four-digit local numbers.

The above twelve area codes and their six 'parent' area codes (01387, 01524, 01539, 01697, 01768 and 01946) are known as 'Mixed' areas due to multiple area codes sharing the same SABC digits (i.e. the initial zero and the following four digits).

National dialling only ranges
These ranges have subscriber numbers beginning with the digits "0" or "1", e.g.:

Currently, these numbers are mostly used as the termination points for non-geographic numbers, and by some automated systems such as alarms. As such they are not usually meant to be directly dialled. Using these numbers directly has been problematic as some mobile phone operators in the UK do not allow access to these ranges, and there may also be difficulty accessing these numbers from outside the UK.

Regulator Ofcom proposes that in future these ranges be released for wider, general-purpose use in up to 70 area codes facing number shortage but then, in order to avoid confusion with codes beginning with these digits, the area code would always have to be dialled for all calls, even from within the same geographic exchange. Accordingly, if these numbers are eventually released for general use, Ofcom proposes completely removing the ability to dial locally without the area code in areas affected.

Requiring the use of the area code also allows additional local numbers starting with normally protected Special Services numbers (such as 999, 101, 111, 112 etc.) to be used, significantly increasing the quantity of numbers available for use. This occurred on 1 November 2012 for the 01202 area code, which covers the Bournemouth area.

Recently, the carrier TalkTalk have inadvertently released parts of the 020 0011 range to the general public, with these numbers currently being in use. For example, the charity Give a Car used the number 020 0011 1664 for a while, but recently switched to a proper London number.

Mobile telephones 
 07xxx xxx xxx—mobile phones and WiFi numbers.

Individual mobile phone companies are allocated different ranges within the 073xx, 074xx, 075xx, 07624, 077xx, 078xx and 079xx area codes. Changes to mobile phone numbers in the Big Number Change were mostly straight replacements, such as Vodafone customers on the 0378 block became 07778.

Since the advent of Mobile number portability, mobile phone number prefixes can no longer be relied on to determine the current operator of a particular mobile phone – only the original operator.

Pagers and personal numbering
 07x xxxx xxxx—pagers and personal numbering (PNS).

Personal numbers beginning 070 are regulated by Phone-paid Services Authority.

Calls to 070 and 076 numbers are often charged at a much higher rate than the similar-looking 07xxx mobile telephone numbers and often they are not included in "inclusive minutes" in phone contracts.

From 1 October 2019, Ofcom has capped the termination or wholesale rate for calls to 070 numbers to be at the same level as for calls to mobile numbers. Ofcom "expect[s] this will allow phone companies to price calls to these numbers or include them in call allowances in the same way that they do for calls to mobile [number]s".

Non-geographic numbers

Non-geographic numbers charged at geographic rate
 03xx xxx xxxx—"UK-wide" numbering.

03xx is a range of non-geographic numbers introduced in 2007 as a cheaper alternative to the shared-cost non-geographic numbers (such as 0870 or 0845 numbers). In contrast to the 084x/087x range, calls to 03 numbers are considered local calls for billing purposes (i.e., like calls to a geographic number 01 or 02). This means that customers who are benefiting from inclusive minutes on mobile phone or landline calling plans are also able to call these numbers using their inclusive minutes.

There are three different ranges of numbers: those beginning 030x are reserved for qualifying public bodies and non-profit organisations; those beginning 033x can be allocated to anyone; and those beginning 034x and 037x have been allocated for migration from the matching 084x and 087x number ranges respectively.

Corporate and VoIP numbering
 05x xxxx xxxx—Corporate and VoIP numbering.

Unlike 03 numbers there is no uniform pricing for 05 numbers; BT charge a number of different rates depending on the number dialled. Some are charged at geographic rate, others not. Other operators are not required to charge the same rates as BT for calling 05 numbers.

Freephone numbers
 0500 xxx xxx—Freephone services allocated before 1999.

Until July 2017, the 0500 range was used for some freephone services which were originally provided by Mercury Communications Ltd (now Cable & Wireless Worldwide). These numbers were different from the rest of the 05 range in that they are only 9 digits in length after the 0 trunk code, e.g. 0500 007 007 (National Savings and Investments), 0500 2 88 2 91 (BBC Radio 2, 88 to 91 FM), 0500 600 600 (Crimewatch), 0500 600 700 (Watchdog) and 0500 909 693 (BBC Radio 5 Live, 909 and 693 kHz). Numerous universities, government departments, airlines, banks and businesses also used these numbers. They were allocated before the general trend of using longer numbers started in 1997 and long before the rest of the 05 range was assigned to corporate and VoIP numbering after 2000.

The range was withdrawn by Ofcom in July 2017 as a result of a series of consultations starting from 2012. The number range
08085 xxx xxx was made available to owners of 0500 xxx xxx to enable a smooth transition.

 0800 xxx xxx, 0800 xxx xxxx and 0808 xxx xxxx—Freephone services.

There is one short "special" number in this range, 0800 11 11 for Childline.

Additionally, numbers in the range 0808 80x xxxx are reserved for not-for-profit helplines and as such are usually free to call from most mobile telephones. A number of other numbers can also be called for free from mobiles, but this varies by network.

Fixed-rate or special-rate services
 084x xxx xxxx (Special Services basic rate) – non-geographic fixed-rate or special-rate services
087x xxx xxxx (Special Services higher rate) – non-geographic fixed-rate or special-rate services.

With the exception of 080x freephone numbers, 08xx numbers are charged above geographic rates, with some of the extra revenue going to the terminating telco. This additional revenue may be shared with the subscriber, but is often used instead to subsidise additional network services, such as fax-to-email, virtual office applications, call queuing, voicemail and easy number redirection. None of these call management services is exclusive to 08xx numbers and they could be provided on any number range.

Special Services basic rate range:

There were a few short "special" number in this range, such as 0845 46 47 for NHS Direct; this was closed in 2014 and replaced by NHS 111, except in Wales where the transition took place in 2015.

Special Services higher rate range:

The usage of 0871, 0872 and 0873 numbers is regulated by PhonepayPlus.

There was widespread confusion about the cost of calling 084 and 087 numbers until 2015. They often do not qualify for discounts and bundled minutes, and can be prohibitively expensive when called from mobiles and payphones. Many major companies persist in misdescribing them as "Local Rate", "Lo Call" (often as '' which can be easily misread as 'local rate') or "National Rate" for which the Advertising Standards Authority can take action.

Access charge and service charge
From 1 July 2015, the charge for calls to 084, 087, 09 and 118 numbers has been simplified. It is split into two parts: An access charge, payable to the telephone service provider – e.g. BT, EE, Sky – plus a service charge paid to the company offering the service.

Companies with 084, 087, and 09 numbers must declare the service charge element of the call cost when advertising their phone number; for example, a number may be advertised saying "Calls cost 20p per minute plus your phone company's access charge". Telecoms companies must inform their customers about their access charge for calling each number range. The EU Consumer Rights Directive requires that many entities that held 084 and 087 numbers will no longer be allowed to use them. The directive bans the usage of numbers that cost more than calling a geographic number for customer service and complaints lines, and other such purposes. Since Britain left the EU the Directive as such no longer applies, but its provisions may have been incorporated into British law.

Other 08xx number ranges
 08xx xxx xxxx—Internet for schools and Inbound routing codes.

Premium rate content services (PRS and SES)
 09xx xxx xxxx—Premium Rate Content Services

Numbers in the 09xx range are charged at the highest rates of any calls within the United Kingdom, and are controlled by various regulations regarding their use. The regulator is the Phone-paid Services Authority, formerly PhonepayPlus. There are a large number of charge bands, some with high pence-per-minute rates, others with a high fixed-price for the entire call.

The earlier unused 092x xxx xxxx – 099x xxx xxxx allocation for "Broadband Internet Services" no longer exists and was removed from the number plan in 2005.

Crown dependencies 
Although calls from UK landlines to landlines in the islands are charged at the same rate as those to other UK landlines (i.e. they are not treated as international calls), calls may be excluded from calling plans offering unlimited UK fixed line calls.

Mobile operators may also charge more for calls to the islands and these calls are usually excluded from calling plans. Calls and SMS messages sent to island mobile phone numbers are not charged at the same rate as calls to UK mobile phone numbers.

Guernsey
This area code is used for the Bailiwick of Guernsey, i.e. including Alderney and Sark.

Jersey

Several Jersey companies also have non-geographic numbers allocated.

Isle of Man

On the Isle of Man, both fixed (01624) and mobile phone (07624) numbers can be dialled locally in the six-digit format.

Fictitious numbers 
Ofcom has also reserved certain number ranges for use in television dramas and films, so as to avoid the risk of people having their telephone numbers displayed and receiving unwanted calls. This is similar to the use of fictitious telephone numbers in the United States and Canada starting with the digits 555.

In most of the large cities with three-digit area codes, a range of numbers is reserved, usually all the numbers starting with the digits 496. For fictitious numbers in other areas, the area code 01632 is reserved; this code is not in use, although 0632 was used for Newcastle upon Tyne until the late 1980s (63 = NE) and briefly reallocated for use by premium rate services in the 1990s. There are also reserved ranges for fictitious mobile, freephone and premium rate numbers.

The Post Office even produced dial centre labels for use in advertisements and film/TV with a mythical exchange called VINcent plus four digits. The numerical equivalent of VIN was 846 and all the caller got was the speaking clock (i.e. 846 is also numerical equivalent of TIM) in the big city "Director" areas.

At around the same time as the other Big Number Change changes, Ofcom revised their recommendations to update the prefixes, add additional areas and increase the size of the allocation from 10 to 1,000 numbers per block. Those changes are listed in the Big Number Change article.

In Coronation Street, the fictional Manchester suburb of Weatherfield uses the unallocated range (0161) 715 xxxx.

Special service numbers

Emergency services and helplines 
The UK has two free emergency numbers: the traditional 999, which is still widely used, and the EU standard 112. Both 999 and 112 are used to contact all emergency services: Police, Fire Service, Ambulance Service and Coastguard. (Standard advice for Mountain Rescue or Cave Rescue is to ask the emergency operator for the police, who oversee the communication with these two services.)

Both numbers can be called from mobile phones with the keylock on or without entering the PIN where that would otherwise be required. Although some mobile phones allow emergency calls to be attempted without a SIM card, at present the UK networks reject such calls. Since November 2009, an emergency call can be made through any UK mobile network as long as there is a SIM for any valid UK network in the handset. Although UK VOIP phone providers are required to offer 999 / 112 service, this is subject to a registration for the service and with a verified service address and users need to be aware such service may not work in a power blackout; however, International VOIP providers may not provide this service.

The chargeable number 101 was introduced for non-urgent crime and community safety calls on a trial basis in 2006. In Wales, the scheme was taken forward by all four police forces, who adopted the number for non-emergency calls on a permanent basis in early 2009. In England, the scheme was on trial until 2012, when it was adopted nationwide and the cost to call changed from 10p per call to 15p per call. In Northern Ireland, the number was introduced by the Police Service of Northern Ireland in March 2014. Since 1 April 2020 the number is free to call.

The operator is obtained via 100 from landlines, while directory enquiries, formerly 192, is now provided in the 118xxx range, (not to be confused with 0118, the area code for Reading.) e.g. 118 212, 118 800, 118 500, 118 118, by different companies. International operator assistance is reached through 155.

From early 2010, the pan-European 116 number range came into use for social helplines. The first three numbers allocated were Missing People using 116 000 for a missing children helpline, the NSPCC ChildLine on 116 111, and Samaritans using 116 123 for an emotional support helpline. A recent consultation for the numbers 116 106 and 116 117 has yet to see any result.

The National Health Service (NHS) can be reached on 111 for non-emergency calls (from landlines and mobiles only). In other European countries, the number 116 117 is used for a similar purpose.

The NHS has also launched a COVID-19 helpline on 119 relating to swabbing so these calls do not go through the 111 call centre.

Local electricity network operators can be reached on 105 to report power cuts.

Two telephone helplines within the regular code space have only eight digits, namely 0800 11 11 for ChildLine and 0845 4647 for NHS Direct in Wales.

The number 159 ('Call 159') has been introduced to give a standard number for calling banks, in an effort to reduce scams where people are tricked into calling someone pretending to be their bank.

Speaking clock 
Since the mid-1990s, speaking clock services have been available throughout Great Britain using the number 123. Before this, exchanges in "Director" areas (Birmingham, Edinburgh, Glasgow, Liverpool, London and Manchester) dialled 846 (TIM), later changing to 123; main exchanges in "non-Director" areas originally used "952", later changing to "80" with the introduction of STD and eventually to "8081" as other recorded services were introduced on 80X1 codes. Some mobile operators allocate other services to 123, such as customer services or voicemail.

Automated services and access codes 
Short codes beginning with 1 are reserved for telecom service providers' own functionality; some of the most well-known are codes for use with Caller Display:

Many fixed line telephone subscribers, e.g. of BT, Virgin Media, SkyTalk, TalkTalk, and PlusNet, have the opportunity to use an automated messaging service which takes messages when the called number is either engaged ("busy") or not answered within a given time. This can be accessed by calling 1571.

For fixed line users, it is possible to override the carrier pre-selection (CPS) on a per-call basis, dialling a special code before the number, e.g. 1280 for BT, 1664 for LowerCall, or 1844 for Daisy. Ofcom defines the range for these as: "124 to 140, 143 to 146, 148 to 149, 160 to 169, and 181 to 189 inclusive. Numbers of up to 5-digits used to access an Indirect Access Provider (‘Type B Access Codes’)".

History

Telephone numbers in Overseas Territories 
Telephone numbers in British Overseas Territories do not come under the UK telephone numbering plan. These calls are treated as international calls. Below are the access codes for the overseas territories:

North American Numbering Plan 

 Anguilla +1 (264) xxx xxxx
 Bermuda +1 (441) xxx xxxx
 British Virgin Islands +1 (284) xxx xxxx
 Cayman Islands +1 (345) xxx xxxx
 Montserrat +1 (664) xxx xxxx
 Turks and Caicos Islands +1 (649) xxx xxxx

Others 
 British Antarctic Territory +44 (Shared with the UK)
 British Indian Ocean Territory +246
 Falkland Islands and South Georgia and the South Sandwich Islands +500
 Gibraltar +350
 Saint Helena and Tristan da Cunha +290
 Ascension Island +247
 Akrotiri and Dhekelia +357 (Shared with Cyprus)
 Pitcairn Islands +64 (Shared with New Zealand)

See also 
 Big Number Change
 List of dialling codes in the United Kingdom
 List of UK dialling codes covering Wales
 Non-geographic telephone numbers in the United Kingdom
 Telecommunications in the United Kingdom
 Telephone number
 Telephone number portability
 Telephone numbering plan
 Telephone numbers in Ireland
 UK telephone code misconceptions—includes the common "0207" and "0208" misconceptions
 Calling party pays

Notes

References

External links 
 UK Numbering Policy section of Ofcom's website
 UK National Telephone Numbering Plan (PDF)
 Ofcom – Telephone Area Code Tool – UK dialling code lookup 
 Ralph Adam, 'Send a boy – or dial it yourself? numbering for the information society', ASLIB Proceedings, 51:1, January 1999
 UK telephone numbering plan in detail
 Regular Expressions for Validating and Formatting GB Telephone Numbers
 The first 25 years of STD code changes summarised (PDF)
 UK Area Codes lookup

 
United Kingdom
Telephone numbers